Lino Cauzzo (3 February 1924 – 11 August 1998) was an Italian professional football player.

Cauzzo died on 11 August 1998, at the age of 74.

References

1924 births
1998 deaths
Italian footballers
Serie A players
Juventus F.C. players
Venezia F.C. players
U.S. Lecce players
A.C. Cuneo 1905 players
Association football midfielders